Wole Soyinka Prize for Literature in Africa is a pan-African writing prize awarded biennially to the best literary work produced by an African. It was established by the Lumina Foundation in 2005 in honour of Africa's first Nobel Laureate in Literature, Wole Soyinka, who presents the prize, which is chosen by an international jury of literary figures. Administered by the Lumina Foundation, the prize has been described as "the African equivalent of the Nobel Prize".

The winner receives $20,000 at the awards ceremony in Lagos or a selected city in Africa. Entries must be written in English or French.  Although originally all genres were considered for every award, since 2014 only one genre is eligible for each edition of the award, with drama being considered for 2014, poetry in 2016, and prose in 2018.

Winners
2006 Sefi Atta, Everything Good Will Come. The inaugural award took place on 5 August 2006 at the Muson Centre, Lagos, Nigeria, where the guest speaker was former Ghana President John Agyekum Kufuor.
2008 Nnedi Okorafor, Zahrah the Windseeker
2010 (shared prize)
Kopano Matlwa, Coconut
Wale Okediran, Tenants of The House 
2012 Sifiso Mzobe, Young Blood
2014 Akin Bello, The Egbon of Lagos (play)
2018 (shared prize)
Harriet Anena, A Nation in Labour
Tanure Ojaide, Songs of Myself

See also
Grand Prix of Literary Associations

Notes

External links
Wole Soyinka Prize for Literature in Africa official website

Awards established in 2005
2005 establishments in Nigeria
African literary awards
Nigerian literary awards
Biennial events